Do Men Love Women? is a 1912 Australian silent film directed by Alfred Rolfe about an alcoholic who reforms through the love of a good woman. The finale featured a railway collision.

It is a lost film.

Plot
Chapter headings for the film were:
the dinner party
the first sign of the inebriate
the success of the young novelist
a patient wife
heartbroken
the drunkard's action
the curse of drink
the love of a woman
cured
the nurses' intrigue
this is our child
repentance
the great railway smash
men do love women.

Cast
Charles Villiers

Production
The film was shot in Sydney.

Reception
The film seems to have been widely distributed, with the railway collision prominently advertised. Reviews were generally strong. It was described as a "modern East Lynne".

Charles Villiers, who appeared in the cast, would accompany screenings of the film as a lecturer.

References

External links
 
Do Men Love Women? at AustLit

1912 films
Australian black-and-white films
Australian silent feature films
Lost Australian films
Films directed by Alfred Rolfe